This article lists the results for the Switzerland national football team from 2010 to 2019.

2010s

2010

2011

2012

2013

2014

2015

2016

2017

2018

2019

Notes

References

External links
 Switzerland Results
 |title=FIFA.com Switzerland: Fixtures and Results

2000
1999–2000 in Swiss football
2000–01 in Swiss football
2001–02 in Swiss football
2002–03 in Swiss football
2003–04 in Swiss football
2004–05 in Swiss football
2005–06 in Swiss football
2006–07 in Swiss football
2007–08 in Swiss football
2008–09 in Swiss football
2009–10 in Swiss football
2010–11 in Swiss football
2011–12 in Swiss football
2012–13 in Swiss football
2013–14 in Swiss football
2014–15 in Swiss football
2015–16 in Swiss football
2016–17 in Swiss football
2017–18 in Swiss football